Flim-Flam is a live album by saxophonists Steve Lacy and Steve Potts, which was recorded in Berne, Switzerland in 1986 and first released on the hat ART label in 1991.

Reception

The Allmusic review by Thom Jurek called it "a swinging affair" stating "While there are edges and some outrageous improvisation, Steve Potts (right channel) and Steve Lacy (left channel) keep this firmly in the Monk-ian jazz vein. ... Given that these men played together for such a long time, that there is such instantaneous call and response should not be a surprise. However, there is also something to be said for restraint, and the pair practice that here as well. This is a blowing date to be sure, with lots of interesting and remarkable improvisation, but both men are interested primarily in using their instruments to carry 'song,' which they did to the delight of the Swiss audience who heard them, and anyone who encounters this recording".

Track listing
All compositions by Steve Lacy
 "The Crust" – 6:18
 "Flim-Flam" – 11:04
 "3 Points" – 21:04
 "The Whammies!" – 8:03
 "Rimace Poco" – 8:39
 "The Gleam" – 10:51

Personnel
Steve Lacy – soprano saxophone
Steve Potts – alto saxophone, soprano saxophone

References

Steve Lacy (saxophonist) live albums
1991 live albums
Hathut Records live albums